Yarmasu is a village in Gülnar district of  Mersin Province, Turkey. At  it is situated to the southwest of Gülnar. The population of Yarmasu was  569 as of 2012.

References

Villages in Gülnar District